North Scranton Junior High School is a historic junior high school building located at Scranton, Lackawanna County, Pennsylvania. It was built between 1922 and 1924, and is a three-story, brick and stone building in the Late Gothic Revival style.  It features a four-story clock tower and a tall Gothic arch surrounding the main entrance.  The school was abandoned in 1987. In 2015, the building re-opened as an apartment for senior citizens.

It was added to the National Register of Historic Places in 1999.

References

School buildings on the National Register of Historic Places in Pennsylvania
Gothic Revival architecture in Pennsylvania
School buildings completed in 1924
Buildings and structures in Scranton, Pennsylvania
National Register of Historic Places in Lackawanna County, Pennsylvania
1924 establishments in Pennsylvania